Jan Ślusarczyk (20 November 1903 – 31 August 1980) was a Polish sculptor. His work was part of the sculpture event in the art competition at the 1948 Summer Olympics.

References

External links
 

1903 births
1980 deaths
20th-century Polish sculptors
Polish male sculptors
20th-century male artists
Olympic competitors in art competitions
People from Piotrków County
Recipient of the Meritorious Activist of Culture badge